The Ohio water resource region is one of 21 major geographic areas, or regions, in the first level of classification used by the United States Geological Survey to divide and sub-divide the United States into successively smaller hydrologic units. These geographic areas contain either the drainage area of a major river, or the combined drainage areas of a series of rivers.

This region includes the drainage of the Ohio River Basin, excluding the Tennessee River Basin. Includes parts of Illinois, Indiana, Kentucky, Maryland, New York, North Carolina, Ohio, Pennsylvania, Tennessee, Virginia and West Virginia.

List of water resource subregions

See also 

 List of rivers in the United States
 Water resource region

References 

Lists of drainage basins
Drainage basins
Watersheds of the United States
Regions of the United States
Water resource regions